Dorothy Berry (born 1942) is an Australian artist working in the genres of Outsider art, and Art Brut, based in Melbourne, Victoria, Australia. She is known primarily for her densely composed depictions of animals and birdlife, executed in pastel. Berry resides in the Melbourne suburb of Kingsbury and has worked from her Northcote-based studio at Arts Project Australia since 1985. Berry's work has been represented in four solo exhibitions, and has exhibited widely, both nationally and internationally in group shows, including ‘My Puppet, My Secret Self’, at the Substation, Newport; ‘Inside Out/Outside In’, Access Gallery, National Gallery of Victoria, Melbourne; and ‘Turning the Page’, Gallery 101, Ottawa, Ontario, Canada. Her work is held in the collections of the National Gallery of Australia and MADMusée, Liège, Belgium, and the Centre for Australian Art.

Early life and education
Berry is primarily a self-taught artist who attributes her artistic talents to her mother. Since 1985 she has maintained a studio at Arts Project Australia (APA), an organization devoted to supporting and promoting artists living with an intellectual disability. The APA does not provide training but rather, provides access to fine art materials. Although her work has thematically changed very little over the course of her career she substituted pastel for paint as the preferred medium for her work during the early years of her studio residency at APA.

Exhibitions
Another APA artist, Maxine Ryder, proposed a collaborative project with Berry resulting in the exhibition Cut It Out (referring to the collaborative wood cut-outs) in the 1995 show. Berry's first solo exhibition followed shortly thereafter, in 1996. During the late 1980s and early 1990s, she attended weekly life-drawing classes at the School of Art at Phillip Institute of Technology (now RMIT University).

Collections
Berry's work is included in three museum collections. Berry has been identified as one of Australia's key artists within the Outsider Art genre, as can be evidenced by her inclusion in major Outsider Art exhibitions and fairs. Her work has been acquired for major collections at the National Gallery of Australia (Accession number: NGA 2002.431.466) and MADMusée, Liège, Belgium. Two of her lithographs, are held in the collection of the Centre for Australian Art.

Career, themes and style 
Berry's work is described in the popular press as both “instinctive” and “spontaneous,” Recurring themes in her work are animals, birds, and religion, for the course of her career. Maxine Ryder, who collaborated with Berry in her early years and returned to Australia to curate a retrospective exhibition of her work twenty years later, remarks on the autobiographical nature of Berry's work, noting that her bird imagery is most likely a form of self-portraiture and that the recurring themes of marriage and motherhood in her self-portraits are a response to her acquired disability. Her best-known pastel works, which use a palette of heavily saturated colours, feature strong line-work and a stylistic tendency to layer and rework imagery; so much so, that the artwork itself is often destroyed in the process of its making. In recent years, Berry's works have become less gestural and smaller in scale, most likely due to increasing limitations on her physical mobility. In addition to pastel, the artist also works in lithography, acrylic paint and ink whereby "Throughout this experimentation with this variety of mediums, she has remained thematically consistent throughout her years as an artist". Arts writer Samantha Wilson notes that Berry's work "goes from simple line drawings to crowded larger works always with a certain clarity about the images that she wants to depict, from the segmented women’s bodies in the autobiographical section, to the darker, more solid palettes of her depictions of religious figures and nuns."

Solo exhibitions 
Berry has had four solo exhibitions: Dorothy Berry – Bird on a Wire, Arts Project Australia Gallery, Melbourne, 2009; A Survey 1987-2002, Arts Project Australia Gallery, Melbourne, 2002; Recent works, Arts Project Australia Gallery, Melbourne, 1998; Penguins, Ducks, Owls & Angels, Arts Project Australia Gallery, Melbourne, 1996

Selected group exhibitions 
Berry has exhibited in over 30 group exhibitions including:

 Home, locations around Arts Centre Melbourne, the city and the surrounds, 2015
 Melbourne Art Fair, Royal Exhibition Building, Melbourne, 1994 – 2014
 Renegades: Outsider Art, national touring exhibition, 2013 - 2014
 Into the Vault and Out of the Box, Arts Project Australia Gallery, Melbourne, 2014
 Repeat. Restate…Reiterate, Arts Project Australia Gallery, Melbourne, 2013
 My Puppet, My Secret Self, The Substation, Newport, 2012
 Halo and the Glory of Art, McGlade Gallery, ACU Sydney, 2011 - 2012
 This Sensual World, Arts Project Australia, Melbourne, 2011
 Human Nature, Alan Lane Community Gallery; Warrnambool Art Gallery, Warrnambool, 2010
 Fully Booked, Arts Project Australia Gallery, Melbourne, 2010
 By Hand, Arts Project Australia Gallery, Melbourne, 2009
 Snapshot, ACGA Gallery, Federation Square, Melbourne, 2009
 Pearls of Arts Project Australia: The Stuart Purves Collection, National touring exhibition, 2007 - 2009
 The Year of the Bird, Hawkesbury Regional Gallery, NSW, 2008
 Reaching Out, Waldron Hall, County Court of Victoria, Melbourne, 2008
 A Lucid Moment, Arts Project Australia Gallery, Melbourne, 2007
 Yours, Mine and Ours:  50 Years of ABC TV, Penrith Regional Gallery & The Lewers Bequest, Emu Plains, NSW, 2006
 Leo Cussen with Selected Artists, Australian Galleries, Collingwood, Melbourne, 2005
 S,M,L,XL, Arts Project Australia Gallery, Melbourne, 2005
 Home Sweet Home: Works from the Peter Fay Collection, international touring exhibition (Australia and New Zealand), 2004 - 2005
 Exchange, Arts Project Australia Gallery, Melbourne, 2004
 A Sense of Place, Arts Project Australia Gallery, Melbourne, 2003
 Chic, Arts Project Australia Gallery, Melbourne, 2002
 Life Stories, Arts Project Australia, 2001
 Histoire de vivre, l’Orangerie du Luxembourg, Paris, France, 2000
 On Track, Arts Project Australia Gallery, Melbourne, 2000
 Connexions Particulières, MADMusée and Musée d’Art Moderne et d’Art Contemporain, Liège, Belgium, 1999
 Bazaar, Pitspace, RMIT, Bundoora, Melbourne, 1998
 Prints & Artists’ Books, Arts Project Australia Gallery, Melbourne, 1997
 Cut it Out, Collaboration with Maxine Ryder, Arts Project Australia Gallery, Melbourne, 1995
 Art des Antipodes, MADMusée, Liège, Belgium, 1995
 Vita Gallery, Oregon, USA, 1995
 Beyond Words VicHealth Access Gallery, National Gallery of Victoria, 1994
 MADMusée, Liège, Belgium, 1993
Inside Out/Outside In, Access Gallery, National Gallery of Victoria, Melbourne, 1992

Publications 
Cheryl Daye (ed.) Dorothy Berry: Bird on a Wire, exhibition catalogue, Arts Project Australia, Melbourne, 2009.

References

External links 
 Collection of the National Gallery of Art, Canberra

Outsider artists
1942 births
Artists from Melbourne
Living people
Women outsider artists
20th-century Australian women artists
20th-century Australian artists
21st-century Australian women artists
21st-century Australian artists
Artists with disabilities